Punjabi Bagh is a locality in the West Delhi district of Delhi, India. It is one of the three sub-zones of West Delhi.

History 
The land of nearby Madipur village was acquired by government of India for resettlement of refugees from  Pakistan.It was previously called  Refugees colony , but it was renamed as Punjabi Bagh in 1960.

In its earliest stages was the settlement for Hindus and Sikhs who moved from West Punjab during the partition. Not much later it started becoming the locality for big bungalows of wealthy traders, businessmen, and transporters. The area is famous for these huge bungalows mostly in the range of 280–550 square yards, some plots are in the range of 1100–2200 square yards. It has also thus developed an image as a posh locality, mostly residential.

Development 

Punjabi Bagh has seen rapid commercial growth since the mid-90s with the opening of innumerable Banks, Salons, restaurants
such as Domino's, KFC, McDonald's, Wok in the Clouds, Nandos, Thai Wok, Bikanerwala, Cafe Pasha, etc. Other establishments include health clubs, ice cream shops, sportswear showrooms like Adidas, Nike, Reebok etc. Shri Krishan Janmashathmi Mahotsav Punjabi Bagh is celebrated at Punjabi Bagh Stadium (known as Traffic Training Park).

The colony mostly consists of private houses on the bungalow pattern and Kothis (large bungalows). However apartments too exist.
It houses some well known Delhi schools such as the Guru Nanak Public School, S.M. ARYA Public School (Punjabi Bagh), Hans Raj Model School, N C Jindal Public School (NCJPS), S.D. Public School (East Punjabi Bagh) and hospitals like Maharaja Agrasen Hospital, MGS Hospital and Teeny Town Playhomes – Indoor Playground for Kids

Geography 
Divided into 2 parts East and West by Ring Road. It is well connected to various parts of the city and has a fairly good bus network and roads. It is also well connected to the Delhi Metro with 4 stations within the main Punjabi Bagh Chowk area. The stations are Madipur, Shivaji Park (Delhi Metro) and Punjabi Bagh East of the Green Line (Delhi Metro) and Punjabi Bagh West (Delhi Metro) on both green and the recently-opened Pink Line (Delhi Metro).

The Western Part of Punjabi Bagh also has an ISKCON temple. ISKCON temple Punjabi Bagh is around 0.5 kilometers away from Punjabi Bagh Club on Road No.77(in the lane of mother's pride school, it was established in September 2007.

For recreation and social gatherings there is a club called the Punjabi Bagh Club mainly for the residents offering a lot of facilities like swimming, Lawn Tennis, badminton, Roller skating, basketball, table tennis, squash, wedding lawns etc. It also has a well-equipped Gymnasium and rooms for arranging parties and kids entertainment.

Neighboring areas include Ashoka Park, Karampura, Paschim Vihar, Moti Nagar, Shakurpur, Pitam Pura, Bali Nagar,  Raja Garden and Rajouri Garden

Transport 

Inter-State Bus Terminal: 13 km;
Indira Gandhi International Airport Domestic Airport: 14 km;
Indira Gandhi International Airport International Airport: 16 km; 
Connaught Place: 9 km; 
New Delhi Railway Station: 10 km; 
Old Delhi Railway Station: 11 km;

References 

Neighbourhoods in Delhi
District subdivisions of Delhi
West Delhi district